The 1998 Columbia Lions football team was an American football team that represented Columbia University during the 1998 NCAA Division I-AA football season. Columbia tied for fifth in the Ivy League. 

In their 10th season under head coach Ray Tellier, the Lions compiled a 4–6 record and were outscored 175 to 146. Bert Bondi, Paul Roland, Jeremy Taylor and Chris Tillotson were the team captains.  

The Lions' 3–4 conference record tied for fifth in the Ivy League standings. Columbia was outscored 111 to 87 by Ivy opponents. 

Columbia played its homes games at Lawrence A. Wien Stadium in Upper Manhattan, in New York City.

Schedule

References

Columbia
Columbia Lions football seasons
Columbia Lions football